The 1949–50 Colorado College Tigers men's ice hockey team represented the Colorado College in intercollegiate college ice hockey during the 1949–50 NCAA men's ice hockey season. The head coach was Cheddy Thompson and the team captain was Milo Yalich.  The team won the 1950 NCAA Men's Ice Hockey Tournament. The team's leading scorer was Harry Whitworth, who finished third in the nation with 60 points.

Season
Colorado College entered the 1949–50 season looking for a bit of redemption after they lost their first three NCAA tournament games over the previous two seasons. With returning senior Milo Yalich named as team captain, the team opened on the road against the Wichita All-Stars before hosting the same team the following week. The first game was a close affair, with the Tigers winning 5–4 but the next three matches were easily won by Cheddy Thompson's team. The Tigers stayed at home until mid-January and used that advantage to win their first 10 games of the season. The visiting UBC Thunderbirds spoiled their perfect record, handing the Tigers their first two losses of the year but that series was sandwiched between two weekends against the brand new Denver program that was hopelessly outmatched by Colorado College. CC took all four games against their future rival by a combined score of 50–4. After splitting two games during a trip up to Minnesota the Tigers met their biggest competition in the west, the Michigan Wolverines.

CC had lost five of their previous six meetings against the Wolverines and hadn't beaten Michigan since 1946. In the first game Michigan shut down the high-powered CC offense, holding the Tigers to a season-low one goal in a 5–1 CC loss. The next day turned out even worse for the Tigers when they were trounced by Michigan 11–1. The bitter taste of those two losses remained in the team's mouth for two weeks but once they returned to the ice the team was able to take some of their frustration out on Minnesota, winning two games to end the regular season. While Michigan had the best record by far, Colorado College and North Dakota were in contention for the second western seed. While their two records were very similar (15–6–2 vs. 16–5–1) the series the two played against one another ended in CC's favor and was likely the deciding factor in sending the Tigers back to the NCAA tournament.

The Tigers welcomed Boston College in the semifinal and, after BC opened the scoring early in the first, Colorado College produced what was then the most lopsided victory in tournament history. The Tigers' Carl Lawrence gave the team its first lead and then proceeded to score four more times before the game was over. Ron Hartwell, Tony Frasca, Chris Ray and Bill MacDonald also hit the net as CC rolled to a 10–3 win, their first tournament victory. In the championship game CC faced off against Boston University who were in their first season playing varsity ice hockey and led by the nation's leading scorer Jack Garrity. Once again the Tigers surrendered the first goal and went into the second period down 1–0. CC remained off the score sheet until about midway through the game when they notched two goals in the span of 18 seconds and followed it up with a third just over six minutes later. With the game close through two periods there was still hope for both teams but, when Ron Hartwell scored 52 seconds in, the championship appeared to be slipping away from BU. Chris Ray built the lead to 4 before future Hall of Famer Jack Kelley made the score 5–2. After that brief respite the CC offense went on a rampage and scored seven goals in just under 7 minutes of game time with all but one coming from different players. Three more goals were scored before the game ended but the outcome had already been decided and Colorado College skated away with their first national championship.

CC set numerous records over the course of the season. With their 190 goals coming in only 24 games the team averaged just under 8 goals per game (7.91) which is the best rating in history for an NCAA champion (as of 2018). Colorado College twice broke the record for largest margin of victory in the NCAA tournament, winning 10–3 in their first game (+7) and 13–4 in their second (+9). As of 2018 the championship game has the second-widest margin (1961). The 13 goals CC scored in the championship set a record for most in any tournament game that was broken by Michigan in 1953 and remains a record for a championship game (tied with the 1957 CC team). The 23 goals scored in the tournament was a record that was not broken until the tournament expanded to at last double the number of games for a championship team, but still remains a record for any team in the Frozen Four. The +16 total goal differential is still a record for a single tournament that is shared by Michigan in 1953 and Wisconsin in 1983.

Standings

Schedule
During the season Colorado College compiled an 18–5–1 record, and was selected for the NCAA tournament for the third consecutive year.

* Denotes overtime periods

Roster and scoring statistics

The team scored 190 goals over the course of the season, however, there are 194 goals collectively attributed to the players. These extra goals may have come from the alumni game that officially counts as an exhibition game.

Goaltending Statistics

1950 national championship

(W2) Colorado College vs. (E2) Boston University 

Jim Starrak and Tony Frasca were named to the All-Tournament First Team while Roy Ikola and Ron Hartwell were on the All-Tournament Second Team

See also 
1950 NCAA Division I Men's Ice Hockey Tournament
List of NCAA Division I Men's Ice Hockey Tournament champions

References

External links 

Colorado College Tigers men's ice hockey seasons
Colorado College
Colorado College
Colorado College
Colorado College
Colorado College